Naga Kanye is a 1975 Indian Kannada-language film, directed by S. V. Rajendra Singh Babu and produced by S. V. Rajendra Singh Babu. The film stars Vishnuvardhan, Bhavani, Rajasree and Halam. The film has musical score by Chellapilla Satyam.

Cast

Vishnuvardhan
Bhavani
Rajasree
Pramila
Halam
Thoogudeepa Srinivas
Rajanand
Ambareesh in Special Appearance
Tiger Prabhakar in Guest Appearance
B. V. Radha in Guest Appearance

Soundtrack
The music was composed by Chellapilla Satyam.

References

External links
 

1975 films
1970s Kannada-language films
Films scored by Satyam (composer)
1975 directorial debut films
Films directed by Rajendra Singh Babu